Tosapusia isaoi is a species of sea snail, a marine gastropod mollusk, in the family Costellariidae, the ribbed miters.

Description
The length of the shell attains 57.6 mm.

Distribution
This marine species occurs off Japan.

References

 Kuroda, T. (1958-1959). Descriptions of new species of marine shells from Japan. Venus. 20(4): 317–335
 Turner H. 2001. Katalog der Familie Costellariidae Macdonald, 1860. Conchbooks. 1–100 page(s): 38

External links
 Fedosov A.E., Puillandre N., Herrmann M., Dgebuadze P. & Bouchet P. (2017). Phylogeny, systematics, and evolution of the family Costellariidae (Gastropoda: Neogastropoda). Zoological Journal of the Linnean Society. 179(3): 541-626

Costellariidae
Gastropods described in 1959